Neyestan (also Romanized as Neyestān and Neyastān; also known as Negestūn) is a village in Fathabad Rural District, in the Central District of Khatam County, Yazd Province, Iran. At the 2006 census, its population was 47, in 13 families.

References 

Populated places in Khatam County